Đỗ Tuấn Đức (born 6 February 1996) is a Vietnamese badminton player from Hanoi. He was the bronze medalist at the Gimcheon, South Korea 2012 Asian Junior Championships in the mixed doubles event partnered with Lê Thu Huyền. Đỗ won his first BWF Grand Prix title at the 2016 Canada Open with his current partner in mixed doubles Phạm Như Thảo.

Career 
He and his partner Phạm Hồng Nam competed at the 2021 Southeast Asian Games and won a bronze medal after a semifinal battle against Leo Rolly Carnando and Daniel Marthin of Indonesia.

Achievements

Southeast Asian Games 
Men's doubles

Asian Junior Championships 
Mixed doubles

BWF Grand Prix (1 title) 
The BWF Grand Prix had two levels, the Grand Prix and Grand Prix Gold. It was a series of badminton tournaments sanctioned by the Badminton World Federation (BWF) and played between 2007 and 2017.

Mixed doubles

  BWF Grand Prix Gold tournament
  BWF Grand Prix tournament

BWF International Challenge/Series (4 titles, 4 runners-up) 
Men's doubles

Mixed doubles

  BWF International Challenge tournament
  BWF International Series tournament
  BWF Future Series tournament

References

External links 
 

1996 births
Living people
Sportspeople from Hanoi
Vietnamese male badminton players
Badminton players at the 2014 Asian Games
Badminton players at the 2018 Asian Games
Asian Games competitors for Vietnam
Competitors at the 2015 Southeast Asian Games
Competitors at the 2017 Southeast Asian Games
Competitors at the 2019 Southeast Asian Games
Southeast Asian Games bronze medalists for Vietnam
Southeast Asian Games medalists in badminton
21st-century Vietnamese people